Walled Lake Western High School (also known as "Walled Lake Western," "Western," or "WLW"), is a public high school of the Walled Lake Consolidated School District, located in Commerce Township, Michigan in Greater Detroit. The school serves portions of the township, most of Walled Lake, most of Wixom and portions of Novi.

History
Opened in 1969, Walled Lake Western was the second high school in Walled Lake. Western's mascot is the Warrior and the school colors are Royal Blue and Silver (Scarlet was integrated as a school color from 1983 to 2004). Kirsten Haglund, who graduated in 2006, was named Miss America 2008. The International Baccalaureate program started in the 2012–2013 school year for grades 11 and 12.

Academics
In 2009, Walled Lake Western High School was ranked in the top 5% of all schools in the nation by Newsweek magazine. The ranking is calculated by the "number of Advanced Placement, International Baccalaureate and/or Cambridge tests taken by all students at a school in 2008 divided by the number of graduating seniors." Beginning in the fall of 2013, Western will begin the International Baccalaureate Diploma program for 11th and 12th grade students as an alternative to AP Testing.

Athletics

Western used to belong to the Kensington Lakes Activities Association. In 1984, the Warriors baseball team captured the school's first state championship.  The football team won the state title in 1996, and again in 1999 (USA Today 11th ranked in country). Their field is known as Warrior Stadium due to the school's nickname.

Notable alumni
 David Booth – former NHL player
 Craig DeRoche – former Speaker of the Michigan House of Representatives
 Kirsten Haglund – Miss Michigan 2007 and Miss America 2008
 Josh Jones – NFL player for the Seattle Seahawks
 Matt Koleszar – Michigan State Representative
 Cam Vieaux - baseball player
 Cody White - NFL player for the Pittsburgh Steelers

Notes and references

External links

 Walled Lake Western High School

Public high schools in Michigan
Educational institutions established in 1969
Schools in Commerce Township, Michigan
High schools in Oakland County, Michigan
1969 establishments in Michigan
Novi, Michigan